The Grand Aréa is a 2.869 metres high mountain of the Cottian Alps located in the French department of Hautes-Alpes.

Features

The mountain stands in the Massif des Cerces and on the watershed between the valleys of the Guisane and the Clarée, NW of the Col du Granon. The ridge continues westwards with the Col de Buffère and then towards the Pointe des Cerces.

Access to the summit

The summit of the Grand Aréa can be reached by footpaths starting from several neighbouring locations. The hike from the Clarée valley thorough Col de Buffère is considered quite an easy and rewarding walk. The mountain is also a well known destination for ski mountaineering.

Mountain huts 
 Refuge de Buffère (2.076 m).

References

Maps
 French  official cartography (Institut géographique national - IGN); on-line version:  www.geoportail.fr

External links

 
 

Mountains of the Alps
Mountains of Hautes-Alpes